George Bird may refer to:

George Bird (baseball) (1850–1940), American Major League Baseball center fielder
George Bird (coffee planter) (1792–1857), British coffee planter in Ceylon
George Bird (cricketer) (1849–1930), English cricketer
George Bird (athlete) (born 1900), English runner
George William Gregory Bird (1916–1997), British physician and medical researcher

See also
George Bird Grinnell (1849–1938), American anthropologist, historian, naturalist, and writer